The 2011–12 season was Stirling Albion's first season back in the Scottish Second Division, having been relegated from the Scottish First Division at the end of the 2010–11 season. Stirling also competed in the Challenge Cup, League Cup and the Scottish Cup.

Summary
Stirling finished tenth in the Second Division and were relegated to the Third Division. They reached the second round of the Challenge Cup, the first round of the League Cup and the third round of the Scottish Cup.

Management
They began the 2011–12 season under the management of Jocky Scott. In December 2011, Scott was sacked with Greig McDonald being appointed as caretaker manager. In January after two wins in three games he was appointed as manager, becoming the youngest manager in the United Kingdom at the age of 29.

Results & fixtures

Second Division

Challenge Cup

League Cup

Scottish Cup

Player statistics

Squad 
Last updated 5 May 2012 

 

|}

Disciplinary record
Includes all competitive matches.
Last updated 5 May 2012

Team statistics

League table

Transfers

Players in

Players out

References

Stirling Albion F.C. seasons
Stirling Albion